The Lamb & Flag is a pub in St Giles' Street, Oxford, England. It is owned by St John's College. Historically, profits funded DPhil student scholarships. The pub lies just north of the main entrance to St John's College. Lamb & Flag Passage runs through the south side of the building, connecting St Giles' with Museum Road, where there is an entrance to Keble College to the rear of the pub.

The name of the pub comes from the symbol of Christ as the victorious Lamb of God (Agnus Dei) of the Book of Revelation, carrying a banner with a cross, and often gashed in the side. This is also a symbol of St John the Baptist, and so is emblematic of ownership by the College of St John the Baptist.

In January 2021, St John's College announced the pub would close and cease operations on 31 January.

In September 2021, The Inklings, a community interest company, signed a 15-year lease to re-open the pub. The pub reopened in the October of 2022.

History

The Lamb had been operating since at least 1566, situated just south of St John's. In 1613 the college moved the pub to its current site (the old site is today the Dolphin Quadrangle). Though owned by the college, this new site was somewhat further away from the college's main buildings. Since the pub's move, construction of the Sir Thomas White and Kendrew Quadrangles in the twentieth and twenty-first centuries has led to the pub being once again close to St John's activities.

St John's took over the management of the pub in 1997, and used all pub profits to fund scholarships for graduate students. The pub is a Grade II listed building

The Lamb & Flag had suffered a loss of revenues since the start of the COVID-19 pandemic, and closed on January 31, 2021. In September 2021, The Inklings, a community interest company, signed a 15-year lease to re-open it. The pub resumed service in the October of 2022.

Popular culture
It is believed that Thomas Hardy wrote much of his novel Jude the Obscure in this pub.  In this novel, the city of Christminster is a thinly-disguised Oxford, and it is thought that a pub that appears in certain passages of the novel is based on The Lamb & Flag. 

In 1962, following modernisation of The Eagle and Child on the other side of St. Giles, the Inklings, a literary group including C.S. Lewis, started meeting at The Lamb and Flag. These meetings were soon abandoned after Lewis's death in 1963. 

The novelist Graham Greene drank at the pub while a student at Balliol College. and it was mentioned in P.D. James' book "The Children of Men". The pub also featured frequently in episodes of the ITV detective drama Inspector Morse, and in the pilot episode of Endeavour.

Notes

References

External links
 Lamb & Flag Inn

1613 establishments in England
Grade II listed pubs in Oxfordshire
Pubs in Oxford
 Lamb and Flag
St John's College, Oxford